Yermakhan Ibraimov (born 1 January 1972 in Jambyl Region) is a Kazakh boxer who competed in the Light Middleweight (71 kg) at the 2000 Summer Olympics and won the gold medal. Four years earlier, at the 1996 Summer Olympics in Atlanta, he captured the bronze medal. He also won the bronze medal at the 1999 World Amateur Boxing Championships in Houston, Texas, and a silver one at the previous edition in Budapest. His first coach is Bakshar Karsybaev.

Olympic results
1996
Defeated Nick Farrell (Canada) 15–4
Defeated Hendrik Simangunsong (Indonesia) RSC 1 (2:14)
Defeated Markus Beyer (Germany) 19–9
Lost to Alfredo Duvergel (Cuba) 19–28

2000
Defeated Yousif Massas (Syria) RSC 3
Defeated Hely Yánes (Venezuela) RSC 3
Defeated Juan Hernández Sierra (Cuba) 16–9
Defeated Jermain Taylor (United States) RSC 4
Defeated Marian Simion (Romania) 25–23

External links
 
 profile
 sports-reference

1972 births
Living people
People from Jambyl Region
Dughlats
Boxers at the 1996 Summer Olympics
Boxers at the 2000 Summer Olympics
Olympic boxers of Kazakhstan
Olympic bronze medalists for Kazakhstan
Olympic gold medalists for Kazakhstan
Olympic medalists in boxing
Asian Games medalists in boxing
Boxers at the 1998 Asian Games
Kazakhstani male boxers
AIBA World Boxing Championships medalists
Medalists at the 2000 Summer Olympics
Medalists at the 1996 Summer Olympics
Asian Games gold medalists for Kazakhstan
Medalists at the 1998 Asian Games
Light-middleweight boxers